The 2018 IIHF World Championship was an international ice hockey tournament hosted by the Danish cities of Copenhagen and Herning, held from 4–20 May 2018. The IIHF announced the winning bid on 23 May 2014 in Minsk, Belarus. South Korea made its debut at the World Championship, having played in the lower divisions previously.

Sweden went undefeated at the tournament to win their second consecutive and eleventh overall title after defeating Switzerland in the final. The United States won the bronze medal game, defeating Canada 4–1.

The official mascot of the tournament was a cygnet, inspired by the Danish writer and poet Hans Christian Andersen's fairytale about The Ugly Duckling.

Bids
There were two bids to host this championship.

  Denmark
 Copenhagen/Herning
Denmark is the only top-ranked IIHF country that has never hosted the tournament. The proposed arenas were the Royal Arena in Copenhagen and the Jyske Bank Boxen in Herning. Both arenas have a capacity of around 12,000 for hockey games.

  Latvia
 Riga
Latvia hosted the IIHF World Championship in 2006. The proposed arenas were Arena Riga, and a secondary venue to be built.

The decision was announced on 23 May 2014 in Minsk, Belarus. The final tally was 95-12 in favor of Denmark.

Venues

Qualified teams

 Qualified as host

 Automatic qualifier after a top 14 placement at the 2017 IIHF World Championship

 Qualified through winning a promotion at the 2017 IIHF World Championship Division I

Seeding
The seeding in the preliminary round was based on the 2017 IIHF World Ranking, which ended at the conclusion of the 2017 IIHF World Championship.

Denmark and Sweden played in separate groups, Denmark at the Jyske Bank Boxen while Sweden at the Royal Arena in Copenhagen.

Group A
 (2)
 (3)
 (6)
 (7)
 (10)
 (11)
1 (13)
 (16)

Group B
 (1)
 (4)
 (5)
 (8)
 (9)
 (12)
1 (14)
 (21)

1 Denmark and France swapped sides so Denmark would not be in the same group as Sweden.

Rosters

Each team's roster consisted of at least 15 skaters (forwards, and defencemen) and 2 goaltenders, and at most 22 skaters and 3 goaltenders. All 16 participating nations, through the confirmation of their respective national associations, had to submit a "Long List" no later than two weeks before the tournament, and a final roster by the Passport Control meeting prior to the start of tournament.

Officials
16 referees and linesman were announced on 21 March 2018.

Preliminary round
The schedule was released on 8 August 2017.

Group A

Group B

Playoff round

Quarterfinals

Semifinals

Bronze medal game

Gold medal game

Final ranking and statistics

Final ranking

Scoring leaders
List shows the top skaters sorted by points, then goals.

GP = Games played; G = Goals; A = Assists; Pts = Points; +/− = Plus/minus; PIM = Penalties in minutes; POS = Position
Source: IIHF.com

Goaltending leaders
Only the top five goaltenders, based on save percentage, who have played at least 40% of their team's minutes, are included in this list.

TOI = Time on Ice (minutes:seconds); SA = Shots against; GA = Goals against; GAA = Goals against average; Sv% = Save percentage; SO = Shutouts
Source: IIHF.com

Awards
Best players selected by the directorate:
Best Goaltender:  Frederik Andersen
Best Defenceman:  John Klingberg
Best Forward:  Sebastian Aho
Source: IIHF.com

Media All-Stars:
MVP:  Patrick Kane
Goaltender:  Anders Nilsson
Defencemen:  Adam Larsson /  Oliver Ekman-Larsson
Forwards:  Rickard Rakell /  Patrick Kane /  Sebastian Aho
Source: IIHF.com

References

External links
Official website

 
IIHF World Championship
1
International ice hockey competitions hosted by Denmark
2017–18 in Danish ice hockey
International sports competitions in Copenhagen
Sport in Herning
IIHF World Championship